Thermidarctia is a genus of moths in the subfamily Arctiinae.

Species
 Thermidarctia thermidoides Talbot, 1929
 Thermidarctia thirmida Hering, 1926

References

Natural History Museum Lepidoptera generic names catalog

Arctiinae